Legislative Assembly elections were held in the Indian state of West Bengal in 1991. The election took place simultaneously with the 1991 Indian general election. The term of the assembly elected in 1987 lasted until February 1992, but the West Bengal government asked the Election Commission of India to arrange the election at an earlier date.

Parties contesting the election

Left Front
The campaign of the Left Front focused on issues relating to secularism, communal harmony and the Mandal Commission.

The Communist Party of India (Marxist), the dominant partner in the Left Front, opted to deny reelection to 23 incumbent legislators, including one minister (Abdul Bari). In total CPI(M) fielded 204 candidates, All India Forward Bloc 34, RSP 23, CPI 12, West Bengal Socialist Party 4, Marxist Forward Bloc 2, DSP 2, RCPI 2, CRLI 1, JD 8 and the Akhil Bharatiya Gorkha League 1.

Congress
The Indian National Congress had seat-sharing arrangement, whereby INC contested 285 seats, the Jharkhand Party 4, the GNLF 3, UCPI 1 and 1 independent.

Ahead of the 1991 elections, the Indian National Congress brought back former Chief Minister Siddhartha Shankar Ray into the party and appointed him head of the West Bengal party unit. Whilst the Indian National Congress was keen to exploit Ray's popularity, the CPI(M) organ Ganashakti published articles on a daily basis reminding voters of Ray's role during the Emergency.

The Indian National Congress was suffering from internal divisions in West Bengal at the time of the election. The West Bengal state party HQ was attacked by disgruntled Congressmen. In the midst of a rally in Diamond Harbour, with Rajiv Gandhi as speaker, rival Congress factions clashed.

At the time, the United Communist Party of India was a Congress ally. UCPI fielded a single candidate in Chandrakona constituency, who finished in second place.

Bharatiya Janata Party
The Bharatiya Janata Party fielded 291 candidates across the state, and managed to increase its share of votes from 0.51% in 1987 to 11.34%. This was the first time BJP fielded such a large number of candidates in West Bengal assembly elections. Rather than focusing primarily on the Ayodhya issue, which was highlighted in the BJP campaigns across the country, the West Bengal BJP campaign concentrated on agitations against immigration from Bangladesh. The campaign sought to invoke Bengali memories of Partition. Whilst support for BJP increased amongst Bengali communities, its main stronghold in the state remained non-Bengali populations in Calcutta (Marwaris and Gujaratis).

Socialist Unity Centre of India
The Socialist Unity Centre of India fielded 59 candidates, contesting as independents. It had launched an electoral front ahead of the polls, along with some Naxalite factions, the Workers Party of India, a RCPI faction and the Bolshevik Party of India. SUCI won two seats.

Results
The election was won by the Left Front, marking its fourth consecutive assembly election victory. The Left Front and allies won 245 out of the 294 seats.

Elected members

See also 
 1991 Kandua hand-chopping

References

External links
 West Bangal General Legislative Election Results at the Election Commission of India

State Assembly elections in West Bengal
1990s in West Bengal
West Bengal